The following is a list of pipeline accidents in the United States in 2018. It is one of several lists of U.S. pipeline accidents. See also list of natural gas and oil production accidents in the United States.

Incidents 

This is not a complete list of all pipeline accidents. For natural gas alone, the Pipeline and Hazardous Materials Safety Administration (PHMSA), a United States Department of Transportation agency, has collected data on more than 3,200 accidents deemed serious or significant since 1987.

A "significant incident" results in any of the following consequences:
 fatality or injury requiring in-patient hospitalization
 $50,000 or more in total costs, measured in 1984 dollars
 liquid releases of five or more barrels (42 US gal/barrel)
 releases resulting in an unintentional fire or explosion

PHMSA and the National Transportation Safety Board (NTSB) post incident data and results of investigations into accidents involving pipelines that carry a variety of products, including natural gas, oil, diesel fuel, gasoline, kerosene, jet fuel, carbon dioxide, and other substances. Occasionally pipelines are repurposed to carry different products.

 On January 8, a 12-inch pipeline was damaged and leaked 500 barrels (27,500 gallons) of gasoline in Eagan, MN. No injuries were reported; however, gasoline flowed into the stormwater system. According to Magellan Midstream Partners, the owner of the pipeline, a contractor the company hired accidentally struck and broke open the pipeline that runs from Rosemount to Minneapolis.
 On January 10, a pipeline in Pearl City, Hawaii ruptured and leaked an estimated 500 gallons of fuel oil into two residents' yards. The state Department of Health says a small amount of oil entered the stream.
 On January 14, a natural gas pipeline ruptured, leading to a fire in Geismar, Louisiana. No injuries or fatalities were reported.
 On January 30, a crew using a boring drill hit a natural gas pipe in Arlington, Texas. Escaping gas ignited and burned for over three hours. There were no injuries.
 On January 31, a portion of a pipeline experienced an in-service rupture near the city of Summerfield, Ohio. The rupture of the 24-inch interstate pipeline resulted in the release of approximately 23,500 MCF of natural gas in a rural forested area. A root cause analysis concluded that the girth weld failure was caused by axial stress due to movement of the pipe that exceeded the cross-sectional tensile strength of the net section weld zone surrounding the crack initiation location. There were no injuries.
 On February 18, a 16-inch crude oil pipeline ruptured in Yukon, Oklahoma. Oil accumulated in a 7-acre private pond. About 84,000 gallons of crude were spilled.
 On February 23, a house in a suburb of Dallas, Texas exploded, killing a girl and injuring 4 others in her family. This followed a number of gas distribution line leaks in that area over the previous months. Atmos crew then started large scale replacement of gas lines in that area, resulting in at least 2,800 homes being without gas service for days to weeks. NTSB Investigators were sent to the area. 
 On March 3, a fallen electric wire from a utility pole caused a gas line to rupture and burn in Wenham, Massachusetts. There were no injuries reported.
 On March 21, a Marathon Petroleum pipeline spilled about 42,000 gallons of diesel fuel near Solitude, Indiana.
 On April 30, a pipeline failure occurred in a remote mountainous region of Marshall County, West Virginia, resulting in the release of 2,658 barrels of propane. The failure and subsequent release was caused by lateral movement of the 8-inch intrastate pipeline due to earth movement along the right-of-way. 
 On May 10, a crude oil pipeline ruptured in Oklahoma City, Oklahoma, leaving a film of crude on a school playground, homes and automobiles. At least 630 gallons of crude were released.
 On May 14, a tractor crashed into a valve on an NGL pipeline in St. Mary Parish, Louisiana, releasing a cloud of a blend of propane, butane, ethane and natural gasoline. Residents and two schools were evacuated for several hours. There was no fire or explosion.
 On May 23, a pipeline rupture and fire in Bienville Parish, Louisiana forced at least 30 nearby residents to evacuate. There were no injuries.
 On June 7, a 36-inch natural gas transmission pipeline exploded and burned near Wheeling, West Virginia. There were no injuries. The pipeline went into service in January 2018. Shifting land was identified as the cause.
 On June 14, a gas pipeline in Tulsa, Oklahoma was ruptured by a tractor. A firefighter and four Oklahoma Natural Gas workers were injured in the explosion and fire that followed the rupture. An initial report said one of the injured was a bystander.
 On June 15, A Southern Star Central Natural Gas pipeline exploded outside Hesston, Kansas, sending flames shooting 75 to 100 feet into the sky.
 On June 19, a Sunoco pipeline leaked more than 33,000 gallons of gasoline into a creek near Philadelphia, Pennsylvania. PHMSA said it first learned of the spill on the evening of June 19 from a “private citizen” who reported a petroleum odor at Darby Creek. About two-thirds of the spill were recovered.
 July 10: After a gas explosion, later Court documents say a contractor failed to properly mark a natural gas line that was struck, which caused a deadly explosion in downtown Sun Prairie, Wisconsin. A search warrant unsealed in Dane County Circuit Court says a utility marking employee failed to correctly mark the gas line in the street, instead targeting a spot on a sidewalk about 25 feet away. A firefighter was killed when a subcontractor placing fiber communication lines underground ruptured a gas line, which triggered an explosion and fire. Another firefighter was critically injured. The blast destroyed six businesses and one home.
 On August 1, a series of gas pipeline explosions injured seven pipeline workers and firefighters in Midland County, Texas. One injured worker later died. They were responding to a leak report.
 On September 6, a 6-inch Dominion Energy gas gathering pipeline burned near Clarksburg, West Virginia. Lightning was suspected of hitting the pipeline.
 On September 7, a Buckeye Partners pipeline ruptured in Decatur, Indiana, spilling about 8,000 gallons of jet fuel into the St. Marys River (Indiana and Ohio).
 On September 10, the 24-inch Revolution Pipeline of Energy Transfer Partners gas transmission pipeline exploded and burned in Center Township, Beaver County, Pennsylvania. One home, two garages, and six steel high tension power line towers were destroyed, but no injuries were reported. The pipeline had been operating for one week before the failure. Earth movement was suspected as the cause.  Later, the Pennsylvania state Department of Environmental Protection (DEP) issued one of its largest-ever civil penalties in the wake of an investigation, which found that Energy Transfer had violated numerous regulations during construction of the Revolution pipeline in western Pennsylvania.
 On September 13, the Massachusetts gas explosions destroyed 40 homes, killed one person, and 21 others were sent to the hospital.
 On November 10, a pipeline ruptured and caught fire in Sutton County, Texas, injuring two people.
 On December 13, a Kinder Morgan pipeline ruptured near Las Cruces, New Mexico. About 462,000 gallons of gasoline were spilled into an irrigation ditch, with some of it suspected of reaching ground water. Later, three nearby properties were bought by Kinder Morgan. The cause appeared to be external corrosion, resulting in a safety order from PHMSA.

References 

Lists of pipeline accidents in the United States
2018 disasters in the United States